Bitner is a surname. Notable people with the surname include:

David Bitner (1948–2011), American politician 
Jason Bitner, author
Richard Bitner (born 1966), American author

See also
Maria Bitner-Glindzicz (1963–2018), British doctor
Bittner